Chicama is a town in Northern Peru, capital of the district of Chicama of Ascope Province in the region La Libertad. This town is located beside the Pan-American Highway some 33 km north of Trujillo city in the agricultural Chicama Valley.

See also
Ascope Province
Puerto Chicama
Chavimochic
Virú Valley
Virú
Valley of Moche
 Huanchaco

References

See also 
Chicama Waves

External links 
Location of Chicama

Populated places in La Libertad Region